Udimsky is a rural locality (a settlement) in Privodinskoye Urban Settlement of Kotlassky District, Arkhangelsk Oblast, Russia. The population was 2,081 as of 2010. There are 37 streets.

Geography 
Udimsky is located 55 km southwest of Kotlas (the district's administrative centre) by road. Udima is the nearest rural locality.

References 

Rural localities in Kotlassky District